Grand Goâve is a commune in the Léogâne Arrondissement in the Ouest department of southwestern Haiti.

The Rivière de Grand Goâve passes to the east of the town.  It is bridged by National Route No. 2 to the south and forded by Rue Tonnere to the east.

History
The town is one of the oldest cities of the country, and was named Goâve by the Amerindians. The Spanish called it Aguava at the end of the 16th century. After French colonization through the releasing of the Spanish, the French divided the city into two halves, Grand-Goâve and Petit-Goâve.

2010 earthquake
Grand-Goâve was 90% destroyed by the earthquake of 12 January 2010. All public buildings were destroyed, including the schools, city hall, and police station. The trembling created a landslide which formed a landslide dam that can potentially contain a large basin of water. A dam collapse would directly outflow the contents through the city. The dam is located on the Rivière de Grand Goâve, a dozen kilometres from the city.

On the 19th, 1300 US Marines were deployed equally between Petit-Goâve and Grand-Goâve. Catholic Relief Services have been distributing the aid that the US military has been delivering.  was deployed in Baie de Grand Goâve to help rebuild Grand-Goâve.

References

Populated places in Ouest (department)
Communes of Haiti
Port cities in the Caribbean